Cherryville is an unincorporated community located within Franklin Township, in Hunterdon County, New Jersey, United States.

History
A tavern was built in Cherryville in 1736.

Around 1830, a stone schoolhouse was erected.  It was replaced by a wood-frame school in 1860.

A Baptist church was founded in Cherryville in 1849.

By 1882, Cherryville had a post office, and was described as being in  "a superior farming district".  It had a population of 65.

References

Franklin Township, Hunterdon County, New Jersey
1736 establishments in New Jersey
Unincorporated communities in Hunterdon County, New Jersey
Unincorporated communities in New Jersey